The fifth season of the American television drama series Scandal was ordered on May 7, 2015, by ABC, and began airing on September 24, 2015, in the United States on ABC. The season was produced by ABC Studios, in association with ShondaLand Production Company; the showrunner being Shonda Rhimes. 

The season continues the story of Olivia Pope's crisis management firm, Olivia Pope & Associates, and its staff, as well as staff at the White House in Washington D.C. Season five has eleven series regulars, all returning from the previous season, out of which six are part of the original cast of eight regulars from the first season and three new regulars were added. The season will continue to air in the Thursday 9:00 pm timeslot, the same as the previous season as it was moved to make room for ShondaLand Production Company's new TV series, How to Get Away with Murder.

On March 3, 2016, ABC announced that Scandal was renewed for a sixth season.

Overview
The series focuses on Olivia Pope and her crisis management firm, Olivia Pope & Associates, and its staff, as well as staff at the White House in Washington D.C. as political scandals occur and they must try to deal with them.

Cast and characters

Main

 Kerry Washington as Olivia Pope 
 Scott Foley as Jacob "Jake" Ballard
Darby Stanchfield as Abigail "Abby" Whelan 
 Katie Lowes as Quinn Perkins 
 Guillermo Diaz as Diego "Huck" Muñoz
 Jeff Perry as Cyrus Beene 
 Joshua Malina as Attorney General David Rosen
 Bellamy Young as Senator Melody "Mellie" Grant
 Portia de Rossi as VP's Chief of Staff Elizabeth North
 Joe Morton as Rowan "Eli" Pope
 Cornelius Smith Jr. as Marcus Walker
 Tony Goldwyn as President Fitzgerald "Fitz" Thomas  Grant III

Recurring
 Artemis Pebdani as Vice President Susan Ross
 Kate Burton as Sally Langston, former Vice President
 George Newbern as Charlie
 Ricardo Chavira as Governor Francisco Vargas of Pennsylvania 
 Mía Maestro as Elise Martin 
 Gregg Henry  as Hollis Doyle
 Norm Lewis as Senate Majority Leader Edison Davis
 Joelle Carter as Vanessa Moss
 Erica Shaffer as News Reporter 
 Mackenzie Astin as Noah Baker
 John Prosky as Senator Gibson 
 Rose Abdoo as Senator Linda Moskowitz  
 Romy Rosemont as Patty Snell 
 Paul Adelstein as Leo Bergen
 Brian Letscher as Tom Larsen
 Matthew Del Negro as Michael Ambruso 
 Annabeth Gish as Lillian Forrester
 Danny Pino as Alejandro "Alex" Vargas

Guest stars
 Adam J. Yeend as Danny Mendoza 
 Dearbhla Molloy as Queen Isabel
 Adam Fergus as Prince Richard
 Hilty Bowen as Princess Emily
 Josh Brener as Gavin Price
 Julie Claire as Francesca Hunter 
 William Russ as Frank Holland
 Denise Crosby as Janet Holland
 Brian White as Franklin Russell
 Jon Tenney as Andrew Nichols

Production

Development
Scandal was renewed for a fifth season on May 7, 2015, by ABC. The series will continue to air at Thursdays in the timeslot 9:00 p.m. E.T. like the previous season, as it was moved to the timeslot to make room for ShondaLand Production Company's new TV series, How to Get Away with Murder. Production began on May 21, 2015, when Rhimes announced on Twitter that the writers were in full swing mapping the fifth season. 

The remaining fall schedule for ABC was announced on November 16, 2015, where it was announced that Scandal would air nine episodes in the fall with the fall finale to air on November 19, 2015, just like the rest of ABC's primetime lineup "TGIT" Grey's Anatomy and How To Get Away with Murder, which was the same last year. The remaining 12 episodes will air after the winter break, beginning on February 11, 2016, as a result of ABC airing the television miniseries Madoff over two nights on February 3–4, 2016 in the same time-slot as Scandal and Grey's Anatomy. The show was renewed by ABC for a sixth season on March 3, 2016.

Writing
Shonda Rhimes said in an interview that the fifth season will begin only a few days after the events in the fourth-season finale. She stated that the fifth season will see Olivia and Fitz the only people standing in a single piece, as she said "The world had been fairly blown apart for everybody except Olivia and Fitz. Everybody else was in a fairly blown apart place ... We pick up right there in that environment and we see what happens next." Rhimes continued talking about Cyrus and Mellie and their situation of not being in the White House anymore. 

Rhimes also confirmed that "the reconstitution" of Team OPA would happen in the fifth season, as Rhimes revealed in an interview with TVLine, as she explained that the Gladiator conceit was sidelined a bit in the fourth season to instead "healing" Olivia. She noted that "a lot of times it was just Huck and Quinn gladiating by themselves. And that wasn’t the same dynamic."

Filming
Scouting began in the beginning of July. The table read for the first episode was announced to occur on July 14, 2015, by Kerry Washington. The title of the season premiere, "Heavy is the Head" was revealed on August 8, 2015, by its director Tom Verica on Twitter. Filming for the season began on July 16, 2015.

Several actors working on ShondaLand-produced shows directed an episode for the fifth season. Tony Goldwyn from Scandal directed the second and 17th episodes, making it the fourth and fifth episodes he has directed on the show.  Chandra Wilson, who plays Dr. Miranda Bailey on Grey's Anatomy, directed her first Scandal episode, which was the sixth episode "Get Out of Jail, Free". Scott Foley from Scandal also directed his first Scandal episode, the 16th named "The Miseducation of Susan Ross". Foley's director-debut was announced on Twitter by Foley himself and executive producer Tom Verica.

Casting

The fifth season had twelve roles receiving star billing, with eleven of them returning from the previous season, eight of which part of the original cast from the first season, and three new cast members being added. Kerry Washington continued to play her role as protagonist of the series, Olivia Pope, a former White House Director of Communications with her own crisis management firm. Darby Stanchfield played Abby Whelan, the White House Press Secretary, Katie Lowes portrayed Quinn Perkins, and Guillermo Diaz portrayed Huck, the troubled tech guy who works for Olivia. Cornelius Smith Jr. continued his role as activist Marcus Walker. after being upgraded to series regular. Jeff Perry continued to portray Cyrus Beene, chief of staff at the White House who was fired by Fitz but later rehired. Portia de Rossi played Elizabeth North, the new chief of staff at the White House, and later the chief of staff for the vice president. Joshua Malina played the role of David Rosen, former U.S. Attorney, now Attorney General. Bellamy Young continued to act as First Lady/Senator Melody "Mellie" Grant, who was kicked out of the White House by Fitz, and later joined the presidential campaign for president. Tony Goldwyn continued to portray President Fitzgerald "Fitz" Thomas Grant III. Scott Foley portrayed Jake Ballard a former B613 agent and later the head of the NSA. 

On May 14, 2015, after the fourth-season finale, it was announced that Portia de Rossi had been promoted to a series regular for the fifth season. TVLine reported in late April that a new gladiator would be added to Olivia Pope & Associates, and the person would be a guest star. It was also announced on July 7, 2015, that Cornelius Smith Jr., who had a guest role in season four playing activist Marcus Walker, will be returning as a series regular for the fifth season, but will not appear until later in the fall. On August 24, 2015, it was announced that actress Mia Maestro would be recurring during the fifth season, but the specifics of her role were not revealed. Julie Claire was announced on September 1, 2015, to have joined the cast in a guest role. 

It was announced on February 4, 2016, that Ricardo Chavira would join the show in a recurring role, and would first appear in the eleventh episode. Annabeth Gish was announced on February 8, 2016, to have been cast in a recurring role. The Hollywood Reporter announced on February 18, 2016, that Joe Morton who plays Rowan "Eli" Pope had been promoted to a series regular, and was credited as a regular cast member for the first time in the twelfth episode.

Episodes

Reception
The review aggregator website Rotten Tomatoes reports a 92% approval rating with an average rating of 7.13/10 based on 13 reviews. The website's consensus reads, "Increased pressure on a key couple brings heightened stakes and more exciting twists to Scandal's action-packed, consistently gripping fifth season.

Live + SD Ratings

Live + 7 Day (DVR) ratings

Awards and nominations

DVD release

References

External links
 
 

2015 American television seasons
2016 American television seasons
Season 5